Akbarpour is a surname. Notable people with the surname include:

Ahmad Akbarpour (born 1970), Iranian writer
Alireza Akbarpour (born 1973), Iranian footballer and manager
Siavash Akbarpour (born 1985), Iranian footballer and coach

Iranian-language surnames